HaAh HaGadol 9 (lit. The Big Brother 9) is the ninth season of the Israeli version of the reality show Big Brother. It's the first season in Reshet, as well as the first Israeli season in HDTV. It also became the longest-running Israeli season to date, lasting 120 days, surpassing the previous record of season 5, which lasted 115 days.
The season premiered on 5 May 2018 and concluded on 1 September 2018, and was hosted by Liron Weizmann, Asi Israelof and Ofer Shechter.

Housemates

Adel
 Adel Bespalov 25, Bat Yam. 
 She participated in the second season of the Israeli Amazing Race.

Amos
 Amos Halfon 55, Nofekh

Avivit
 Avivit Bar Zohar 36, Tel Aviv. 
 She previously appeared on HaAh HaGadol 4, where she was evicted less than a week before the final event.

Bar
 Bar Sandler 24, Rishon Letzion

Daniel
 Daniel Greenberg 24, Meitar

Eli
 Eli Zarka 30, Costa Rica

Eliav
 Eliav Rachamin 22, Qiryat Gat

Ilan
 Ilan Koren 56, Kfar Saba

Ina
 Ina Styoert 32, Tel Aviv

Israel
 Israel Ogalbo 27, Tel Aviv

Liraz
 Liraz Assayag 35, Petah Tikva

Liron
 Liron Ofir 25, Haifa

Maggie
 Maggie Tabibi 23, Holon

Maria
 Maria Domark 22, Kiryat Ono

Moshiko
 Moshiko Passal Givatayim

Meirav
 Meirav Israel 37, Netanya

Neta
 Neta Barazani 20, Bat Yam. 
 She participated in the sixth season of the Israeli Amazing Race.

Omri
 Omri Ben Natan 32, Ramat Gan. 
 He previously finished in third place on HaAh HaGadol 7.

Orly
 Orly Yechezkel 58, Bat Yam

Roy
 Roy Kornblum 23, Hod HaSharon

Samuel
 Samuel Hagai 35, New York

Shams
 Shams Marei Abumuch 35, Baqa al-Gharbiyye

Sima
 Sima Maimon Bakhar 41, Miami

Tammy
 Tammy Montag 28, Ramat Gan

Tay
 Tay Sharky 22, Herzliya

Tiltil
 Liron "Tiltil" Urpali 43, Ramat Gan. 
 He was the winner of the seventh season of the Israeli Survivor Israeli in 2015 and participated in the fourth season of the Israeli Amazing Race.

Tomer
 Tomer "Rotchild" Ben Ya'akov 26, Tel Aviv

Nominations table

Notes

: Housemates entered on Day 1 got the power to give one of the housemates entered on Day 2 an immunity for the first eviction. They chose Liron.
: On Day 9, Tay had left the house temporarily to receive medical attention. On Day 10, It was revealed that he would not be returning to the house.
: The original nominees were Orly, Liron, Liraz, Sima and Tammy, but the housemates had violated the rules from the beginning of the season, all housemates are nominated for eviction this week. Maggie, who was the Head of House this week, also lost her immunity.
: On Day 35, Tammy had left the house, due to apparently serious family issues.
: This week was a week of surprises. On Day 40, an eviction has taken place, when the housemates hadn't known about before. 
: On Day 43, there was another entrance of new housemates, which the existing ones also haven't known yet. Also, the existing housemates don't know that the new housemates won't be in the house for a long time. They are taking part in a secret mission which Big Brother organized. It is possible, that one of those housemates would be a permanent housemate, that can advance to the final. This situation depends on the audience's decision only. In the end, Adel and Avivit had returned to the house as permanent housemates.
: On Day 43, Liron had left the house, due to personal reasons, including his longings for his partner.
: Tomer was automatically nominated for eviction by Big Brother, due to planning nominations with Meirav.
: During the spontaneous task in the house, Roy was spontaneously asked by Big Brother to nominate for eviction in front of the housemates.
: In this week, eviction took place about four days after the entry of the new housemates, eviction in which they were immune from it. Moreover, on the exact evening of the entrance, they were asked to make their nominations in front of all of the housemates.
: In this week, Amos was awarded immunity from eviction after a successful secret mission of his and Meirav, in which they had to pretend to be exes from the far past.
:  In this week, the housemates were asked to name two housemates they would like to save from eviction.
: Tomer was ejected from the house for violating the house rules.
: This week, as part of the mission around the world in Korea, the housemates of North Korea were nominated for eviction.
: Eli decided to leave the house on the night between Day 97 and Day 98.
: Housemates were asked to give the name of a housemate who they think should receive a ticket to the final, three weeks before the finale. The result was a tie between Roy and Israel, and the decision was passed on to the viewers. Israel received the most votes. Big Brother surprised the housemates and announced that Israel had an opportunity to win a new car, but he has to give up the ticket to the final if he took the car. Israel was forced to make the decision live and decided to give up the car. Israel has received the final ticket, while the car will be the prize for the housemate who reaches the second place.
: The public were voting to win rather than to save.

Nominations totals received

References

External links
  

2018 Israeli television seasons
09